Avá-Canoeiro, known as Avá or Canoe, is a minor Tupi–Guaraní language of the state of Goiás, in Brazil. All speakers are monolingual.

Phonology

Vowels

Consonants 

 Nasals /m, n/ can be heard as voiced plosives [b, d] freely in word-initial positions.

References

External links

Tupi–Guarani languages